JCSAT-2 was a geostationary communications satellite designed and manufactured by Hughes (now Boeing) on the HS-393 satellite bus. It was originally ordered by Japan Communications Satellite Company (JCSAT), which later merged into the JSAT Corporation. It had a Ku-band payload and operated on the 154° East longitude until it was replaced by JCSAT-2A.

Satellite description 
The spacecraft was designed and manufactured by Hughes Space and Communications Company on the HS-393 satellite bus. With its solar panels fully extended it spanned . Its power system generated approximately 2350 watts of power thanks to two cylindrical solar panels. It also had a two 38 Ah NiH2 batteries. It would serve as the main satellite on the 150° East longitude position of the JSAT fleet.

It also used two axial and four radial  bipropellant thrusters for station keeping and attitude control. It included enough propellant for orbit circularization and 8 years of operation. Its payload was composed of a  antenna fed by thirty-two 27 MHz Ku-band transponders for a total bandwidth of 864 MHz. The Ku-band transponders had a Traveling-wave tube#Traveling-wave-tube amplifier (TWTA) output power of 20 watts.

History 
With the opening of the Japanese satellite communications market to private investment, Japan Communications Satellite Company (JCSAT) was founded in 1985. In June of the same year, JCSAT awarded an order to Hughes Space and Communications for two identical satellites, JCSAT-1 and JCSAT-2, based on the spin-stabilized HS-393 satellite bus. JCSAT-2 was successfully launched aboard a Commercial Titan III (maiden launch) along Skynet 4A on 1 January 1990 at 00:07 UTC. Originally expected to be retired in 2000, it was finally sent to a graveyard orbit on 2002.

References 

Communications satellites in geostationary orbit
Spacecraft launched in 1990
Satellites using the HS-393 bus
Communications satellites of Japan
Satellites of Japan